Dornbusch (literally: thornbush) is a quarter of Frankfurt am Main, Germany. It is part of the Ortsbezirk Mitte-Nord. Dornbusch has a local U-Bahn station of the same name that is served by lines U1, U2, U3 & U8. It can be found on eschersheimer landstraße and is located alongside the Sinaipark.

References

Districts of Frankfurt